Amanita gioiosa is a species of Amanita found in Italy growing among Arbutus, chestnut, oaks, and pines.

References

External links

gioiosa
Fungi of Europe
Fungi described in 1991